is a technical college in Imizu, Toyama, Japan. It is located across the street from Toyama College of Welfare Science.

External links
 Official website 
 English homepage

Universities and colleges in Toyama Prefecture